Dame Henriette Alice, Lady Abel Smith,  ( Cadogan; 6 June 1914 – 3 May 2005) was a lady-in-waiting to Queen Elizabeth II from 1949 to 1987.

Early life
Henriette Alice Cadogan was the daughter of Commander Francis Charles Cadogan, a Royal Navy officer of Quenington Old Rectory, Cirencester, Gloucestershire, (a grandson of Henry Charles Cadogan, 4th Earl Cadogan) by his wife Ruth Evelyn Howard, a daughter of Sir Edward Stafford Howard, a great-nephew of Bernard Howard, 12th Duke of Norfolk.

Career
She held the office of a Lady-in-Waiting to Queen Elizabeth II from 1949 to 1987. In 1987 she became an Extra Lady-in-Waiting. She served as a Justice of the Peace (JP) for Tunbridge Wells in 1955, and for Gloucestershire in 1971. She was invested as a Commander of the Royal Victorian Order in the 1964 New Year Honours, and was elevated to Dame Commander of the Royal Victorian Order in 1977.

Marriages and progeny
She married twice:
Firstly on 4 September 1939 to Major Sir Anthony Frederick Mark Palmer, 4th Baronet (d.1941), by whom she had progeny as follows:
Sir Mark Palmer, 5th Baronet (born 1941), First Page of Honour to the Queen 1956–1959.  
Antonia Mary Palmer (born 2 August 1940), wife of Lord Christopher John Thynne, younger brother of Alexander Thynn, 7th Marquess of Bath.
Secondly on 17 February 1953 she married Brigadier Sir Alexander Abel Smith (1904–1980) the younger brother of Sir Henry Abel Smith (who in 1931 had married into the Royal Family), by whom she had progeny as follows:
Christopher Abel Smith (born 28 June 1954), a godson of Queen Elizabeth II and First Page of Honour to the Queen 1967–1970.
Juliet Sarah Abel Smith (born 26 Aug 1955)

Death
Abel Smith died on 3 May 2005 at The Garden House, Cirencester, Gloucestershire, aged 90.

References

Sources
[S37] Charles Mosley, editor, Burke's Peerage, Baronetage & Knightage, 107th edition, 3 volumes (Wilmington, Delaware, U.S.A.: Burke's Peerage (Genealogical Books) Ltd, 2003), volume 1, page 2. Hereinafter cited as Burke's Peerage and Baronetage, 107th edition.
[S300] Michael Rhodes, "re: Ernest Fawbert Collection" e-mail message to Darryl Roger Lundy, 8 February. Hereinafter cited as "re: Ernest Fawbert Collection."
[S37] Charles Mosley, Burke's Peerage and Baronetage, 107th edition, volume 1, page 637.
[S466] Notices, The Daily Telegraph, London, UK, 6 June 2005. Hereinafter cited as The Daily Telegraph.

External links
 ThePeerage.com

1914 births
2005 deaths
People from Royal Tunbridge Wells
People from Cirencester
Dames Commander of the Royal Victorian Order
English justices of the peace
Wives of baronets